This is a list of nature centers and environmental education centers in the state of North Carolina. 

To use the sortable tables: click on the icons at the top of each column to sort that column in alphabetical order; click again for reverse alphabetical order.

References
 North Carolina Environmental Education

External links
 Map of nature centers and environmental education centers in North Carolina

 
Nature center
North Carolina